Darya Nikolaevna Ekamasova (born 20 May 1984) is a Russian theater and film actress.  Her film credits include Once Upon a Time There Lived a Simple Woman (2011), Free Floating (2006) and Celestial Wives of the Meadow Mari (2012). She was also featured in the television mini-series Kuprin. Yama (2014). In the fifth and sixth seasons of The Americans (2017-2018), she plays the role of Sofia Kovalenko.

Biography
Darya Ekamasova was born in Moscow, Russian SFSR, Soviet Union. After music school Darya Ekamasova entered directly on the course of the Russian University of Theatre Arts (Workshop Aleksandr Porokhovschikov).

Roles in theater
Daria made her debut in the play, Vladimir Ageev "Captive Spirits" as Lyubochka Mendeleeva (Playwright and Director Center n/p A. Kazantsev and M. Roshchin). Darya Ekamasova Teatr.doc playing in the play "Life is good", which received the Special Jury Prize Dramatic Theatre National Theatre Award "Golden Mask" in 2010 and the play "18th Hour".

Filmography

Film

Television

External links

1984 births
Living people
Russian film actresses
Russian television actresses
Russian stage actresses
Actresses from Moscow
21st-century Russian actresses
Russian Academy of Theatre Arts alumni
Academicians of the Russian Academy of Cinema Arts and Sciences "Nika"
Recipients of the Nika Award